New Grounds Print Workshop, founded in 1996 by Regina Held, is a nontoxic printmaking facility specializing in intaglio and relief printmaking. It is located in Albuquerque, New Mexico, United States. According to the mission statement on their website, New Grounds is "dedicated to providing artists with a professional, informative, safer and well-equipped environment for the creation of fine prints while promoting the artists and exhibiting their work."

Origins and goals 
New Grounds was founded in response to three particular needs: 
The need for a printmaking center in Albuquerque offering classes, press and studio access to all artists working in intaglio and relief printmaking. 
The need to educate the general public about printmaking by offering studio tours, lectures and exhibitions. 
The need for this facility to be nontoxic.  At that time all printmaking constituted a high health risk to artists in addition to having a negative impact on the environment. 

A good definition of nontoxic, or green printmaking, can be found on Friedhard Kiekeben's website, NontoxicPrint.com: "the term nontoxic/non-toxic has become synonymous with safety-conscious practice. Nontoxic processes still use a variety of chemicals, and the ultimate safety of any material and process is dependent on their informed use."

New Grounds utilized the research of the innovators Keith Howard and Mark Zaffron to build a completely green studio, and, according to a research paper written by Liz Chalfin from Zea Mays Printmaking studio, New Grounds was one of the first nontoxic printmaking studios in the United States.

Impact 
New Grounds Print Workshop has had a significant influence on the promotion of nontoxic printmaking. Other workshops have modeled their facilities after New Grounds and printmakers from school teachers to university professors from around the world have studied nontoxic printmaking there.

References

External links 
 

Printmaking groups and organizations